Fjellheisen is an aerial tramway located in the city of Tromsø, Norway.

The lower station is located near sea-level in Tromsdalen, a suburb on the mainland. The upper station is located at Storsteinen, a mountain ledge about 420 m (1,378 ft) above sea-level. The four-minute trip to the upper station is a popular destination in itself, offering visitors a commanding view of the city and the surrounding islands and fjords from an outdoor viewing deck. Food and drink is served in Fjellstua restaurant. Many passengers use the tramway as a launching point for hikes to various mountains in the area, including Tromsdalstinden, the iconic 1,238 m high peak that is easily visible from the city.

The tramway is particularly busy in the summer months, when it is popular with cruise-ship passengers wishing to get a good view of the midnight sun. In winter, the cable car operates from 10 am to 10 pm if weather conditions are not too rough for comfort. It is an excellent vantage point for viewing the Northern Lights.
Fjellheisen is owned by Skips AS Nordfisk and operated by Utelivsbyen AS.

History 
Construction of Fjellheisen was started in 1960. The builder was Brødrene Jakobsens Rederi, a shipping company. The tramway officially opened on February 22, 1961.

External links 
Fjellheisen Official Website (Norwegian and English)
Tromsø Cable Car article on My Little Norway

Cable cars in Norway